LIH may refer to:

 Andrew Lih, American author of The Wikipedia Revolution
 Lihue Airport, Kauai, Hawaii, US, IATA code
 LIH pin, an orthopedic hook-pin
 Lithium hydride, LiH